Lost Highway may refer to:

Music
 Lost Highway Records, a country music record label now part of Universal Music Group Nashville

Albums and EPs
 Lost Highway, a 2002 EP by Helldorado
 Lost Highway (Bon Jovi album), 2007
 Lost Highway: The Concert, 2007
 Lost Highway (Willie Nelson album), a 2009 compilation album

Songs
 "Lost Highway" (Bon Jovi song), 2007
 "Lost Highway" (Leon Payne song), 1948, covered by Hank Williams

Other uses
 Lost Highway (film), a 1997 film by David Lynch
 Lost Highway (soundtrack), the soundtrack for the Lynch film
 Lost Highway (opera), a 2003 opera adaptation of Lynch's film
 Hank Williams: Lost Highway (musical), a stage musical based on the life of Hank Williams